The 1927 Wyoming Cowboys football team was an American football team that represented the University of Wyoming as a member of the Rocky Mountain Conference (RMC) during the 1927 college football season. In their first season under head coach George McLaren, the Cowboys compiled a 4–5 record (1–4 against conference opponents), finished tenth in the RMC, and outscored opponents by a total of 122 to 105.

Schedule

References

Wyoming
Wyoming Cowboys football seasons
Wyoming Cowboys football